Zelenyi Hai is a village in Volnovakha Raion of Donetsk Oblast in eastern Ukraine.

Until 18 July 2020, Zelenyi Hai was located in Velyka Novosilka Raion. The raion was abolished that day as part of the administrative reform of Ukraine, which reduced the number of raions of Donetsk Oblast to eight, of which only five were controlled by the government. The area of Velyka Novosilka Raion was merged into Volnovakha Raion.

Demographics
Native language as of the Ukrainian Census of 2001:
 Ukrainian 89.40%
 Russian 10.38%

References

Villages in Volnovakha Raion